The 2022 Davis Cup qualifying round was held on 4–5 March 2022. The twelve winners of this round qualify for the 2022 Davis Cup Finals while the twelve losers will qualify for the 2022 Davis Cup World Group I.

Teams
Twenty-four teams played for twelve spots in the finals, in series decided on a home and away basis.

Twenty-six eligible teams are:
 16 teams ranked 3rd–18th in the finals
 8 winning teams from World Group I
 2 winning teams from World Group I knock-out ties

Two wild cards for the finals selected from these 26 nations are Serbia and Great Britain. The remaining 24 nations will compete for 12 spots in the Finals.

The 12 winning teams from the play-offs will play at the finals and the 12 losing teams will play at the World Group I.

#: Nations Ranking as of 20 September 2021.

Qualified teams

  (#1)
  (#3)
  (#4)
  (#5)
  (#6)
  (#8)
  (#9)
  (#11)
  (#12)
  (#14)
  (#15)
  (#16)
 
  (#17)
  (#18)
  (#19)
  (#20)
  (#23)
  (#24)
  (#26)
  (#27)
  (#29)
  (#32)
  (#41)
  (#44)

Results summary

Qualifying round results

France vs. Ecuador

Spain vs. Romania

Finland vs. Belgium

United States vs. Colombia

Netherlands vs. Canada

Brazil vs. Germany

Slovakia vs. Italy

Australia vs. Hungary

Norway vs. Kazakhstan

Sweden vs. Japan

Argentina vs. Czech Republic

South Korea vs. Austria

References

External links

Qualifying
Davis Cup
Davis Cup
Davis Cup
Davis Cup
Davis Cup
Davis Cup